Benjamin Finnis (born 8 July 1937) is a British modern pentathlete. He competed at the 1964 Summer Olympics.

References

1937 births
Living people
British male modern pentathletes
Olympic modern pentathletes of Great Britain
Modern pentathletes at the 1964 Summer Olympics